The 13th Moscow International Film Festival was held from 7 to 21 July 1983. The Golden Prizes were awarded to the Moroccan-Guinea-Senegalese film Amok directed by Souheil Ben-Barka, the Nicaraguan-Cuban-Mexican-Costa Rican film Alsino and the Condor directed by Miguel Littín and the Soviet film Vassa directed by Gleb Panfilov.

Jury
 Stanislav Rostotsky (USSR – President of the Jury)
 Maya-Gozel Aimedova (USSR)
 Vladimir Baskakov USSR)
 Blanca Guerra (Mexico)
 Cesare Zavattini (Italy)
 Jacques Duqeau-Rupp (France)
 Stanisław Mikulski (Poland)
 Ulyses Petit de Murat (Argentina)
 Ion Popescu-Gopo (Romania)
 Dusan Roll (Czechoslovakia)
 Alimata Salambere (Upper Volta)
 Mrinal Sen (India)
 Georgi Stoyanov (Bulgaria)
 Pham Nguoc Truong (Vietnam)
 Theo Hinz (West Germany)

Films in competition
The following films were selected for the main competition:

Awards
 Golden Prizes:
 Amok by Souheil Ben-Barka
 Alsino and the Condor by Miguel Littín
 Vassa by Gleb Panfilov
 Special Prizes - For the contribution to cinema:
 Alberto Sordi for I Know That You Know That I Know
 Robert Hossein for Les Misérables
 Silver Prizes:
 Balance by Lyudmil Kirkov
 Doctor Faustus by Franz Seitz
 Concrete Pastures by Štefan Uher
 Prizes:
 Best Actor: Wirgiliusz Gryń for Pastorale heroica
 Best Actor: Yoshi Katō for Hometown
 Best Actress: Judy Davis for Winter of Our Dreams
 Best Actress: Jessica Lange for Frances
 Shadow of the Earth by Taieb Louhichi
 Special Diplomas:
 The Deal by Fernando Ayala
 Five Fingers of One Hand by I. Hyamgavaa, B. Baljinniam
 Return from Hell by Nicolae Mărgineanu
 Prix FIPRESCI:
 Demons in the Garden by Manuel Gutiérrez Aragón
 Without Witness by Nikita Mikhalkov

References

External links
Moscow International Film Festival: 1983 at Internet Movie Database

1983
1983 film festivals
1983 in the Soviet Union
1983 in Moscow